Lazy is the adjective for laziness, a lack of desire to expend effort.

It may also refer to:

Music

Groups and musicians
 Lazy (band), a Japanese rock band
 Lazy Lester, American blues harmonica player Leslie Johnson (1933–2018)
 Lazy Bill Lucas (1918–1982), American blues musician and singer
 Doug Lazy, stage name of American hip hop and dance music producer and DJ Gene Douglas Finley
 Lazy, an American band featuring former members of the Supreme Beings of Leisure

Albums
 Lazy (album), an album by The Hot Monkey

Songs
 "Lazy" (Deep Purple song), 1972
 "Lazy" (Irving Berlin song), 1924
 "Lazy" (Suede song), 1997
 "Lazy" (X-Press 2 song), 2002
 "Lazy", by Exo-CBX from Blooming Days
 "Lazy", by Love & Rockets from Earth, Sun, Moon
 "Lazy", by Parokya Ni Edgar from Gulong Itlog Gulong
 "Lazy", by The Vaccines and Kylie Minogue for A Shaun the Sheep Movie: Farmageddon, 2019

Places
 Lazy (Orlová), a former village now part of the town of Orlová in the Czech Republic
 Lazy pod Makytou, a village and municipality in Slovakia
 Łazy (disambiguation), several towns and villages in Poland
 Lazy Branch, a stream in Missouri, United States

See also
 Laizy, a French commune